Para-taekwondo debuted at the 2020 Summer Paralympics in Tokyo, Japan.

Para-taekwondo is a variant of taekwondo for athletes with a variety of physical disabilities. The sport is governed by World Taekwondo (WT) since 2006. Only kyorugi (sparring) discipline is included and not poomsae (martial art forms).

Medal table 
Updated to 2020 Summer Paralympics

Nations

See also
 Para Taekwondo
Taekwondo at the Summer Olympics

References

Paralympics
Sports at the Summer Paralympics